Argentina competed at the 1980 Summer Paralympics in Arnhem, Netherlands. 11 competitors from Argentina won 15 medals including 4 gold, 5 silver and 6 bronze and finished 24th in the medal table.

See also 
 Argentina at the Paralympics
 Argentina at the 1980 Summer Olympics

References 

Argentina at the Paralympics
1980 in Argentine sport
Nations at the 1980 Summer Paralympics